Beyni rural settlement - is a municipal entity, one of the five rural settlements in Dzheyrakhsky District in the Republic of Ingushetia, Russia.

The rural locality consists of six rural settlements, including its administrative center selo Beyni.

Demography

Administrative structure

References

Rural localities in Ingushetia